Nina Andreyevna Statkevich (born 16 February 1944) is a former speed skater who competed for the Soviet Union.

Nina Statkevich trained at VSS Trud in Leningrad. She won many titles – she was World Allround Champion, European Allround Champion twice, Soviet Allround Champion four times, and Soviet Sprint Champion. She also competed at the Winter Olympics, but never won an Olympic medal, a fifth place at the 1972 Olympics being her best result (on both 1000 m and 3000 m).

Medals
An overview of medals won by Statkevich during important championships she participated in, listing the years in which she won each:

World records
Over the course of her career, Statkevich skated 2 world records on the then still natural ice of Medeo:

Personal bests: 
500 m – 43.32 (1970)
1000 m – 1:28.1 (1973)
1500 m – 2:16.48 (1973)
 3000 m – 4:43.0 (1973)
 5000 m – 8:36.5 (1976)

References

External links
Nina Statkevich at SkateResults.com

1944 births
Living people
Sportspeople from Saint Petersburg 
Russian female speed skaters
Soviet female speed skaters
Olympic speed skaters of the Soviet Union
Speed skaters at the 1972 Winter Olympics
Speed skaters at the 1976 Winter Olympics
World record setters in speed skating
Honoured Masters of Sport of the USSR
Universiade medalists in speed skating
World Allround Speed Skating Championships medalists
Universiade gold medalists for the Soviet Union
Competitors at the 1970 Winter Universiade